Kronic may refer to:

Kronic (DJ), Australian DJ
Kronic, brand of synthetic cannabinoid in Australia

See also
Kronick, surname
Kronik (disambiguation)
Chronic (disambiguation)